RNLB Freddie Cooper (ON 1193) is the current all-weather lifeboat on station in the town of Aldeburgh in the English county of Suffolk. The Freddie Cooper has the operation No: 12-34 and has been on station since 1993. She is a  fast carriage lifeboat.

Description
The Freddie Cooper was laid down in 1992 by Green Marine of Southampton, Hampshire. She was delivered to the station in 1993. Her hull has been constructed using a fibre-reinforced composite making her robust, strong and very light. The lifeboat is designed to self-right if capsized but only if her passenger capacity has reached 21 people. If the lifeboat’s survivor compartment is fully ladened with 43 people then the lifeboat is non self-righting. Due to the nature and terrain at the Aldeburgh station, the lifeboat is launched and retrieved using a supplied carriage which gives her quick and safe access across Aldeburgh’s shingle beach. The lifeboat is powered by two Caterpillar marine diesel 3208T engines. The lifeboats propellers are installed in tunnels which protect them when launching or in the shallow waters as is the situation at Aldeburgh.

Service and rescues

Red House Lugger 
On 29 August 1996, Freddie Cooper was launched, along with Lowestoft lifeboat , to assist the yacht Red House Lugger which had sent out a mayday signal during a storm. On arrival, the lifeboats found that the P&O cargo ferry  was sheltering the yacht. The lifeboats evacuated the yacht's crew, and the Lugger was towed to Harwich, with the rescue taking around 12 hours in total. On 27 November 1996, coxswain of the Freddie Cooper, Ian Firman, received the RNLI bronze medal for his part in the rescue.

Rose Bank 
On Sunday 20 May 2000, the Freddie Cooper was launched to assist the small Dutch yacht Rose Bank, which was struggling in gale force 7 winds. During the search, the weather deteriorated sharply and Harwich lifeboat  was also launched to assist. Initially reported to be seven miles east of Aldeburgh, the Rose Bank had drifted to 20 miles east of Aldeburgh by the time she was located.

All four Rose Bank crew members were rescued, but the lifeboats were unable to secure the yacht for towing. The drifting Rose Bank was recovered three days later by a fishing boat and was towed into Ramsgate in Kent. Coxswain Ian Firman was awarded another RNLI bronze medal for his part in the rescue.

Service and rescues 2000 to date

References

Mersey-class lifeboats